Tongue-Tied is the tenth in a series of collections of short stories by Australian author Paul Jennings. It was released in 2002.

The stories

Tongue-Tied
A boy tries to get a rare fish for a girl in his school, believing that doing so will make her want to kiss him.

Lennie Lighthouse
A boy has teeth that glow in the dark. He has never lived with his mother. But one day, when he finds a letter mentioning where his mother might be, his friend tries to help him meet her for the first time.

Sniffex
A sequel to the Unmentionable story Ex Poser. Boffin has now invented a smell detector, which he hopes will help him find out who has been flatulating every day in class.

The Hat
A boy moves from Melbourne to the Queensland rainforest to live with his father (because his mother, who had divorced, has died). The last thing the boy has to remind him of his mother is a hat, which he always tries to retrieve every time he loses it (even if it means risking his life), but his abilities are pushed to the limit when he loses it while being ordered to stand guard over the last known individual of a species of bilby.

Spot the Dog
While sick in bed, a boy is asked to play a game of Spot the Dog by his mother, whose pictures of landmarks in their home town are very detailed, but lack people. While looking over the picture, the boy seems to end up sucked into the game, and can't figure out how to get out of this strange world.

Hailstone Bugs
As punishment for allowing his mouse to breed, a boy has his head-lopper confiscated, which upsets him because he was planning to use it in an upcoming act. Soon after he finds a weird species which lives inside hailstones, and he tries to put them to a good use.

Shake
Two twin brothers find a box while digging in the vegetable patch; they fight over who should own it, despite the fact that they are so close to each other that they rarely fight. But when one of them to stop arguing the remaining one refuses his brother then has an accident and dies. The remaining brother then feels guilty about his decision, and wants nothing but to shake his brother's hand, even though he knows it's never going to happen. But one day, he discovers what is in the box: an enchanted pair of glasses, which can allow him to do something he never thought he'd be able to do.

Popping Off
A boy is at risk of getting kicked out of his flat, because he has a dog that flatulates because it can't bark.

External links
 The book on Paul Jennings's site
Tongue-Tied on Good Reads

2002 short story collections
Books by Paul Jennings (Australian author)
Australian children's books
Australian short story collections
2002 children's books
Puffin Books books
Children's short story collections